Juan Viñas is a district of the Jiménez canton, in the Cartago province of Costa Rica.

Geography 
Juan Viñas has an area of  km² and an elevation of  metres.

Demographics 

For the 2011 census, Juan Viñas had a population of  inhabitants.

Transportation

Road transportation 
The district is covered by the following road routes:
 National Route 10
 National Route 230

Economy 
It is the home of Ingenio Juan Viñas, the main sugar factory of all the Caribbean Basin of Costa Rica.

References 

Districts of Cartago Province
Populated places in Cartago Province